Tareq Hassan is a UAE footballer. He currently plays for Al-Arabi .

Hassan is one of Al Wasl Club's Academy graduates. He has played in nearly all the different positions on the football pitch, and currently plays as a left back.

Hassan has been chosen as a member of the UAE National Team several times and in many age group teams.

References

Living people
Al-Wasl F.C. players
Emirati footballers
1983 births
Al-Arabi SC (UAE) players
UAE First Division League players
UAE Pro League players
Association football wingers